Giuseppe Varotti (Bologna, 1715- Bologna, 1780) was an Italian painter, active depicting sacred and historical subjects in a late-Baroque or Rococo style.

Biography
He trained with his father, Pier Paolo Varotti (1686-1732), a follower of Giuseppe Maria Crespi. Giuseppe Varotti painted a St Roch once in the church of Santa Maria delle Grazie in Carpi. One of his pupils was Jacopo Alessandro Calvi (1740-1815).

References
Renato Roli, Giuseppe Varotti e il Settecento Bolognese, Galleria de' Fusari

1715 births
1780 deaths
18th-century Italian painters
Italian male painters
Italian Baroque painters
Painters from Bologna
18th-century Italian male artists